Lorenzo Kamel (born 1 October 1980) is Professor of Global History and History of the Middle East and North Africa at the University of Turin, director of the Istituto Affari Internazionalis Research Studies, and scientific director of the "New-Med Research Network".
   
Biography
He held teaching and research positions in universities in the Middle East, the US, and Europe, including the Albert-Ludwigs-Universität Freiburg, where he served as a Marie Curie Experienced Researcher, and Harvard University, where, among other appointments, he was a postdoctoral fellow for two years with a project entitled "Artificial Nations? The Sykes-Picot and the Islamic State's narratives in a historical perspective".
He holds a two-year M.A. in Israeli society and politics from the Hebrew University of Jerusalem, a Ph.D. in history from the University of Bologna, and lived for years in several countries in the Middle East, including, with visiting appointments, Egypt ('Ain Shams University), the Palestinian Territories (Birzeit University), Israel (Hebrew University), and Turkey (Bilkent University). He speaks Italian, English, Hebrew, Arabic and has a working knowledge of French, Ottoman Turkish, and Latin.

Publications
He published fourteen books on Global History, Middle Eastern and Mediterranean affairs, including Imperial perceptions of Palestine: British Influence and Power in Late Ottoman Times, an award-winning and widely acclaimed book  based on sources from 17 archives. The Cambridge Review of International Affairs pointed out that the book "broadens the existing scholarship with a well-researched, even-handed volume that clearly fills a hole in the historiography" while the Journal of Palestine Studies reviewed the book stating that it provides a "fascinating and convincing interpretive analysis". Sara Roy (Harvard University) noted that the book is a "powerful and truly illuminating study", while Hebrew University's Moshe Ma'oz contended that "for anyone with an interest in deconstructing the present of our region this book is a must".
His book entitled The Middle East from Empire to Sealed Identities, was praised by Nicholas Doumanis as "one of the most definitive works on the transition from empire to nation-state". Former MESA's President, Beth Baron, wrote that the book "will make an important mark on the field", while Brian A. Catlos (University of Colorado Boulder) contended that it provides "chronological continuation of much of the most interesting work being done in pre-modern Mediterranean Studies".
His publications include also over 30 articles on leading academic journals such as British Journal of Middle Eastern Studies, Mediterranean Politics, Peace and Change, Eurasian Studies, New Middle Eastern Studies, Passato e Presente, Oriente Moderno, and over 200 articles and policy papers on Al Jazeera, Ha'aretz, Al-Monitor, Project Syndicate, The Daily Star (Lebanon), The National Interest, The National, Aspen, Middle East Eye, and other media outlets in 10 languages, in over 30 countries.

He is a board member of a number of academic journals, including Palgrave Communications, Eurostudium, Passato e Presente, and frequently acts as a peer-reviewer for the European Research Council (ERC Consolidator Grant "The Study of the Human Past"), Cambridge University Press, International Affairs'' (Chatham House), and other institutions, publishing houses and journals.

Prizes

He was awarded with the 2010 "Giuseppe Sciacca International Prize", the Fritz Thyssen Stiftung Grant (2015), and the 2016 "Palestine Academic Book Award" (1st prize, academic section).

References

1980 births
Living people
21st-century Italian historians
Academic staff of the University of Turin